Eucalyptus frenchiana is a species of mallet that is endemic to Western Australia. It has smooth bark, narrow lance-shaped, glossy green adult leaves, ribbed flower buds in groups of three, white flowers and ribbed, conical to cup-shaped fruit.

Description
Eucalyptus frenchiana is a mallet that typically grows to a height of  but does not form a lignotuber. It has smooth light grey over cream bark that is shed in ribbons. Young plants and coppice regrowth have slightly glossy light green leaves that are a paler colour on one side, egg-shaped and petiolate.

Taxonomy and naming
Eucalyptus frenchiana was first formally described in 2009 by Dean Nicolle from a specimen he collected with Malcolm French west of Coolgardie, and the description was published in the journal Nuytsia. The specific epithet (frenchiana) honours French for his assistance in the preparation of the Nuytsia paper.

Distribution and habitat
This mallet grows in mallet-mallee woodland near Lake Johnston in the Coolgardie biogeographic region.

Conservation status
Eucalyptus frenchiana is classified as "Priority Three" by the Government of Western Australia Department of Parks and Wildlife meaning that it is poorly known and known from only a few locations but is not under imminent threat.

See also
List of Eucalyptus species

References

frenchiana
Endemic flora of Western Australia
Myrtales of Australia
Eucalypts of Western Australia
Plants described in 2009